Roger Federer and Max Mirnyi were the defending champions but only Mirnyi competed that year with Mahesh Bhupathi.

Bhupathi and Mirnyi lost in the second round to Arnaud Clément and Sébastien Grosjean.

Wayne Black and Kevin Ullyett won in the final 6–2, 7–6(14–12) against Jonas Björkman and Todd Woodbridge.

Seeds

Draw

Final

Top half

Bottom half

References
 2004 NASDAQ-100 Open Men's Doubles Draw

2004 NASDAQ-100 Open
NASDAQ-100 Open - Men's Doubles